George Hewston (September 11, 1826 – September 4, 1891) was an American politician, educator, and physician. He was appointed the 16th Mayor of San Francisco upon the death of James Otis. He was sworn in on November 4, 1875, and served until December 5, 1875.

Biography 
Hewston was born on September 11, 1826 in Philadelphia, Pennsylvania. He apprenticed himself to a physician and then took a medical degree from the Philadelphia College of Medicine and the University of Pennsylvania. 

He moved with his family to San Francisco to escape the American Civil War. Hewston established a new medical practice upon his arrival, supplementing his income by lecturing at the Toland College of Medicine (later known as  University of California, San Francisco). 

His skill at lecturing brought him to the attention of the People's Party, which nominated him for San Francisco Board of Supervisors in 1873. He was appointed mayor to finish James Otis's unfinished term. During his brief term, Hewston sat in on an investigation into charges against six policemen. He also refused to make inflated payments for unspecified repairs. He was known for making a speech condemning the Chinese for bringing opium into the city.

After his term, he served on the commission to plan California's celebration of America's centennial. His final political activity was as chair of the Anti-Monopoly Party, which sought to stop the transfer of federal lands for the railroads. Hewston then returned to the lecture circuit and travelled along the East Coast, collecting many books along the way. He eventually amassed some 2000 volumes for his private library.

He died on September 4, 1891 in San Francisco of Bright's disease. He was interred at Masonic Cemetery in San Francisco, and when that closed around 1940 he was reinterred at Woodland Cemetery in Colma, California.

References

 Heintz, William F., San Francisco's Mayors:  1850–1880. From the Gold Rush to the Silver Bonanza.  Woodside, CA:  Gilbert Roberts Publications, 1975. (Library of Congress Card No. 75-17094)

1826 births
1891 deaths
Mayors of San Francisco
Perelman School of Medicine at the University of Pennsylvania alumni
Politicians from Philadelphia
San Francisco Board of Supervisors members
University of California, San Francisco faculty
California Populists
Deaths from kidney disease
People's Party (United States) elected officials
19th-century American politicians
Burials at Masonic Cemetery (San Francisco)